is a Japanese playwright, stage director, and the co-founder and leader of the theater company Nitosha. She is known for adopting realism as her primary writing style.

According to The Japan Foundation's Performing Arts Network, Nagai is currently regarded as one of the most sought-after playwrights in Japan because of her "well-made plays," in which social issues are treated from a critical perspective.

Life and work

Early life
Ai Nagai was born on October 16, 1951, in Tokyo, as the daughter of a painter and a member of the Communist Party, Kiyoshi Nagai. Since her parents divorced when she was still young, she was raised by her father and her paternal grandmother, Shizu Nagai. Her father's connections with the theater world when she was young influenced her to take on a path to a theatrical career. In , the character Grandmother Nobu is modeled on Nagai's own grandmother.

After graduating high school, she became a member of the Friends of the Haiyu-za theater company, which enabled her to watch all the company's productions. In 1970, Nagai studied at the theater department of Tōhō Gakuen College for four years, including two years in the postgraduate drama program. The theater department used to be an acting school that was affiliated with the Haiyu-za, where many professional actors had been trained. She chose this college because she became a fan of the actress Etsuko Ichihara and aspired to become a member of the Haiyu-za company. As the popularity of the "Angura" (underground) theater movement grew, she attended performances at small underground theaters. Examples include Jūrō Kara's Jōkyō Gekijo,  Kuro Tento and Ren Saitō's Jiyū Gekijō. Seeing these types of performances made her lose her aspirations of joining a theater company of the Shingeki genre.

After graduating in 1974, Nagai was invited to join the theater company, Spring and Autumn Group (Shunjūdan), where she met Shizuka Ōishi. Since the company disbanded after two years, Nagai and Ōishi decided to write and produce their own plays.

Nitosha Theatre Company
In 1981, Nitosha (The Two Rabbits) Company was established as a theater company. Nagai and Ōishi named their theater company "Nitosha" because they were both born in the Year of the Rabbit. They also acted in original Nitosha productions as they alternate as playwrights. Their quick-changing two women shows such as  helped them gain popularity. In 1991, Ōishi left the company to have a career in TV scenario writing. This left Nagai to direct her own plays herself for Nitosha's productions. This company is still active and it is located in Nerima, Tokyo. Nitosha has consistently provided plays that do not only entertain the audience but also make them feel actually involved and committed to the issues presented on stage.

Theatrical career
Nitosha continues to put works on stage as Nagai writes and directs them. Other organizations like the New National Theatre, Tokyo benefits from her works because she writes for them too. Nagai also used to be the president of the Japan Playwrights Association.

Nagai is active in other countries such as the United Kingdom, the United States, and South Korea. Her plays are also presented as staged readings.

Time's Storeroom
Nagai's  portrayed tough times faced by ordinary Japanese people as they evolve as a response to the turning points of Japanese history. Examples include the immediate aftermath of Japan's defeat in World War II, the high-growth period of Japanese economy, and the final period of campus riots in 1970 against the renewal of the Japan-U.S. Security Treaty

The characters in these works are not interrelated, but Nagai's approach is consistent because the postwar social issues and the plays' significance are portrayed by a particular family or by the events in an apartment building, their living conditions, and what they lost as Japan prioritizes the economic growth in the postwar period.

Nagai also connects  to another social change, the abolition of legal prostitution in 1958. The play illustrates ordinary people at the verge of the changes in life style and people's consciousness because of the rapid economic growth. She also illustrates the anti-Ampo movement that emerged among students at the 1970 renewal of the treaty ten years later.

The Three Hagi Sisters
Adapted from Anton Chekhov's Three Sisters, Nagai wrote  in 2000. The three main characters in Chekhov's play are reflected in Nagai's adaptation. Nagai transforms Chekhov's drama into a comedy. This adaptation confronts current feminist issues and brings to light the disparity between traditional expectations of men and of women. She also depicts the liberation from the socially constructed gender roles in a society that is deeply influenced by a division of labor, attitudes, and behavior by gender.  Nagai's adaptation does not commend the old androcentric idea and the patriarchal perspective of families. Instead, it regards feminism with humor. While Japanese modern family dramas around the 1970s portray family breakdowns, Nagai's adaptation comically depicts the breakdown of the internal world of the sisters.

The play  has 14 scenes and is first staged in 1994 by the Nitosha Theatre Company. This play is also available in the English, Chinese, and Russian languages.

Men Who Try to Make Them Sing

One of Nagai's most popular plays,  is a one-act play written in 2005. It is a social comedy depicting the Tokyo Board of Education's decision in 2003, in which teachers are punished if they fail to abide by the ruling to raise the flag and sing the national anthem at graduation ceremonies.

This play is first staged in 2005 by the Nitosha Theatre Company. The casts included Keiko Toda, Ryosuke Otani, Moeko Koyama, Masami Nakagami, and Yoshimasa Kondo. This play is available in the English language from the Nitosha Theatre Company.

Women in a Holy Mess
Nagai's play  is "a hilarious portrayal of post-menopausal life" that portrays three women's lives and friendship. The play's English translation was developed by Kyoko Yoshida and Andy Bragen in late 2007 at The Playwrights' Center in Minneapolis, Minnesota. This is one of her plays that was read in front of an audience and featured American actors led by Cynthia Croot, a New York City theater director.

Style
Nagai's works focus on using realism. She depicts familiar places, subconscious problems, and issues about language, gender, family, and community. She presents ordinary Japanese people who have experienced some social changes in a comical way in contemporary Japan.

Nagai and another playwright, Hisashi Inoue, have similarities in their approaches because they both aim to write about ordinary people going through extraordinary situations. Both playwrights also write differently compared to other playwrights in their own generation — such as Toshiki Okada and Oriza Hirata. The clear and logical structure of Nagai's plays makes it naturalistic The characters are caught in some predicament and the motor for the play's theatricality is how the characters are liberated from the predicament. Nagai's plays are easily accessible to Western audiences because her works are both traditionally Japanese while also being very universal at the same time. Another playwright, Yōji Sakate, also resembles Nagai because the motivation behind his dramas is his social conscience. Sakate and Nagai both combine elements of Shingeki and Angura.

Awards

Awards and nominations
1997: 1st Tsuruya Nanboku Drama Award for 
1999: 44th Kishida Drama Award for 
2000: 52nd Yomiuri Literature Prize for Scenario and Drama for 
2003: Nagai was nominated for the 8th Yomiuri Theatre Award for Best Direction of 
2005: Nagai was nominated for the 13th Yomiuri Theatre Prize for Best Direction of 
2015: Minister of Education Award for Fine Arts for

Awards and nominations for Nitosha Productions
2001: 
Nitosha won the 1st Backer's Prize
2003: 
Nitosha won the 27th Kinokuniya Theatre Prize for Group Achievement 
Nitosha was nominated for Best Production of the 8th Yomiuri Theatre Award
2005: 
Keiko Toda starred and won both the Akimoto Matsuyo Award of the 5th Asahi Performing Arts Award and the 13th Yomiuri Theatre Prize for Best Actress
Nitosha won both the Grand Prix of the 5th Asahi Performing Arts Award and the 13th Yomiuri Theatre Prize for Best Production
2006:  
Shinobu Terajima starred and won both the 6th Asahi Performing Arts Award and the 14th Yomiuri Theatre Award for Best Actress for her performance
2015: 
Nitosha won the Hayakawa "Higeki Kigeki" ("Comedy and Tragedy") Award

Major works

Plays and adaptations
1983: 
1984: 
1984: 

1994: 
1995: 
1996: 
1997: 
1999: 
2000: 
2001: 
2001: 
2002: 
2004: 
2005: 
2006: 
2010: 
2010: 
2011: 
2014:

Notes

References
Boyd, Mari (trans). 1999. Introduction of Nagai Ai's Time's Storeroom. In Half a Century of Japanese Theater I: The 1990s Part 1, ed. Japan Playwrights Association. Tokyo: Kinokuniya shoten. .
Clayton, J. Douglas, and Yana Meerzon. 2013. Adapting Chekhov: The Text and its Mutations. New York: Routledge. .
Edelson, Loren. 2004. “‘The Three Hagi Sisters’: A Modern Japanese Play by Nagai Ai.” Asian Theatre Journal 21, no. 1 (Spring): 1-98. https://www.jstor.org/stable/4145479.
Japan Society. Play Reading Series features Prominent Japanese Playwright Ai Nagai’s Hilarious Portrayal of Post-Menopausal Life. Women in a Holy Mess. https://web.archive.org/web/20150501114550/http://www.japansociety.org/about/press/ai_nagais_hilarious_portrayal_of_post-menopausal_life. 
Pulvers, Roger. 2006. “Artist Interview: A look into the theater craft of Ai Nagai.” Performing Arts Network Japan. http://www.performingarts.jp/E/art_interview/0601/1.html.
Rimer, J. Thomas, Mitsuya Mori, and M. Cody Poulton. 2014. The Columbia Anthology of Modern Japanese Drama. New York: Columbia University Press. .
Sorgenfrei, Carol Fisher. 2000. Book Review of Half a Century of Japanese Theater I: 1990s Part 1. Asian Theatre Journal 17, no. 2 (Autumn): 303–305. https://www.jstor.org/stable/1124500.

External links
 

Nagai
Nagai
Nagai
Nagai
Nagai
Nagai
Nagai
21st-century Japanese women writers
Yomiuri Prize winners